The Archdeacon of Buckingham is the senior ecclesiastical officer in charge of the Church of England in Buckinghamshire.

The archdeacon has statutory oversight over the ancient Archdeaconry of Buckingham, which has existed since (at latest) the 11th century and was, until 1837, in the Diocese of Lincoln. On 18 August 1837, an Order in Council transferred the archdeaconry to the Diocese of Oxford. The archdeacon has some disciplinary supervision and pastoral care of the clergy in the archdeaconry.

List of archdeacons

References

Sources
GenUKI – early Archdeacons of Sutton-cum-Buckingham

Lists of Anglicans